Robert Scott Blanton (born July 1, 1973) is a former American football kicker in the National Football League for the Washington Redskins. He played college football at the University of Oklahoma.

References

1973 births
Living people
Sportspeople from Norman, Oklahoma
Players of American football from Oklahoma
American football placekickers
Washington Redskins players
Oklahoma Sooners football players